William Lowry House may refer to:

in the United States (by state)
William Lowry House (Bentonville, Indiana), listed on the National Register of Historic Places in Fayette County, Indiana
William C. Lowry House Nicholasville, Kentucky, listed on the National Register of Historic Places in Jessamine County, Kentucky
William Lowry House (Athens, Tennessee), listed on the National Register of Historic Places in McMinn County, Tennessee

See also
Lowry House (disambiguation)